Arthur Benedict Gramlich (1904–1974) was a first generation German-American from Springfield, Illinois.  A coal miner for most of his life, he fought in the multifactional mine wars in central Illinois during the 1920–1940s.  Originally a member of John L. Lewis' United Mine Workers of America, he was one of the early converts to the newly formed Progressive Miners of America union. He served as president of the Progressive Mine Worker union from 1955 to 1957.

References
 An oral interview conducted by Sangamon State University in 1972
 An oral interview mentioning the death of Ed Mabie during an ambush when he was walking with Art Gramlich and the death of Art Gramlich's father

1904 births
1974 deaths
American trade union leaders
American people of German descent
United Mine Workers people